Vortex is a suspended roller coaster at Canada's Wonderland in Vaughan, Ontario. It officially opened during the 1991 season.

As with other suspended roller coasters, Vortex's trains swing under the track. On Vortex, riders are taken up through the top of the mountain and dropped at high speeds. At some points in the ride, the trains swing just above a river running through the middle of the park, giving riders the illusion that the train will touch the water. It is considered to be a terrain coaster due to the influences of the ride track by the mountain and the river.

Ride experience

Like other suspended roller coasters, the ride's trains are able to swing side to side. The train climbs the  lift hill immediately after departing the loading station. The lift takes riders up to the top of Wonder Mountain. Upon cresting the lift, the train slowly turns to the right adding to the suspense of the upcoming drop. The train then quickly dives off the side of the mountain, passing under the track from Wonder Mountain's Guardian, before sweeping to the right and climbing up the "fan-turn" element of the ride that flies over guests on the midway. The train dives into a downward helix, which swings only a few feet above the surface of the water and wraps around Yukon Striker's first drop. Upon returning to the station, the train swoops left and right a few times more until it charges into the brake run. The immense swinging force as the train enters the brake run causes the cars to swing even after the train stops moving. The ride then turns right back into the station.

Similar rides 
The Bat (formerly Top Gun & Flight Deck) was built in 1993 at Wonderland's sister park Kings Island. It has a near identical layout to Vortex, but there are notable differences. They include speed and height variances and the addition of another car to each train, allowing for 28 passengers per train as opposed to 24.

References

External links
 
 

Roller coasters introduced in 1991
Roller coasters in Ontario
Roller coasters operated by Cedar Fair
1991 establishments in Ontario